Joel Rueben Madden (né Combs; March 11, 1979) is an American singer, best known as the lead vocalist for the rock band Good Charlotte. He is also part of the pop rock collaboration the Madden Brothers with his identical twin brother Benji Madden.

Early life
Joel Rueben Combs was born on March 11, 1979, in Waldorf, Maryland, to Robin Madden and Roger Combs. He has an identical twin, Benji Madden, who plays guitar and sings backing vocals in their band, Good Charlotte. He also has an older brother named Josh Madden who also works in the music industry, and a younger sister named Sarah Madden. Madden attended La Plata High School in La Plata, Maryland.

Career

Good Charlotte

In 1995, at the age of 16, Madden, his brother Benji, and a friend started their own band. The band was short-lived and the Maddens eventually recruited fellow high schoolers Paul Thomas, Aaron Escolopio, and Billy Martin to form their band Good Charlotte. They took the name Good Charlotte from the children's book Good Charlotte: Girls of the Good Day Orphanage by Carol Beach York.

Other projects
In the 2001 film Not Another Teen Movie, Madden and the other Good Charlotte members made a cameo appearance as the band at the school's prom. He later had a cameo role in the 2004 film Fat Albert and in the 2006 film Material Girls with his brother Benji. He also had a guest appearance in the hit Nickelodeon musical comedy series The Naked Brothers Band, in which he joined the band for a performance.

Madden started a clothing line called MADE Clothing along with his brothers Benji and Josh. The line is now defunct. In early 2006 MADE Clothing became DCMA Collective. The line is owned by Joel, his brothers Benji Madden, Josh Madden, and friend Tal Cooperman. The Madden brothers also front a production team called Dead Executives.

In November 2007, Nicole Richie and Madden created The Richie Madden Children's Foundation. The charity will create and promote an online registry to inspire the purchases of items for moms and their families in need. He is also a UNICEF Goodwill Ambassador. In 2010, with his brother, Madden contributed to "We Are the World 25 for Haiti," a remake of the song "We Are the World" by USA for Africa, written by Michael Jackson and Lionel Richie.

On November 23, 2011, Madden was confirmed as one of the four vocal coaches in the first season of the Australian version of the reality singing competition The Voice. His brother, Benji Madden was later his mentor on the show.  Joel continued on as a coach in seasons two and three with Benji joining Joel as a coach on seasons 4 & 5 in 2015 and 2016. Because of his commitments to The Voice Australia, he relocated to Sydney.

Madden is featured in Blood on the Dance Floor's fifth studio album on the track "Incomplete and All Alone" released on June 19, 2012. The track was available for free download with pre-orders of the album.

In 2012, Madden joined the 11th annual Independent Music Awards judging panel to assist independent musicians' careers.

In 2013, Madden also provided songwriting and production assistance to the Australian band 5 Seconds of Summer on their first album. He has also helped write songs with them again for their later album Sounds Good Feels Good.

Madden was featured in Alex Kunnari & Heikki L's single "City of Sin", released on July 12, 2013.

Madden was in a pop rock duo with his brother Benji called The Madden Brothers. They released the record Greetings from California, on September 16, 2014. The album title Greetings from California comes from a conversation that the brothers had over breakfast one morning where they were reminiscing over how far they had come since the days of making music in their bedrooms.

In 2015, Madden appeared as guest in the American TV series Empire.

The Voice Australia
From the beginning of the show in 2012 to 2014, he was a solo coach on The Voice Australia. He teamed up with his brother Benji for The Voice Kids in 2014 and on the main series in 2015-2016. In 2013, Joel won the Logie Award for Most Popular New Male Talent for his role as coach on the program.

Ink Master
In 2022, he served as the host of the fourteenth season of Ink Master, replacing Dave Navarro.

Personal life

In July 2004, 25-year-old Madden began dating teen idol Hilary Duff when she was 16. After a long period of tabloid speculation, Duff's mother Susan announced their relationship in a June 2005 interview for Seventeen. In November 2006, Madden and Duff broke up. Writing for Paper in 2015, Abby Schreiber noted that this and similar instances of famous men dating teenage girls had largely been ignored or even defended by tabloids at the time, something she attributed to changing public attitudes as well as tabloids and publicists having more control of information prior to the rise of social media.

Madden started dating Nicole Richie in December 2006. They have two children: a daughter born in 2008 and a son born in 2009. The couple confirmed their engagement in February 2010, and married on December 11, 2010. Joel's brother Benji is married to actress Cameron Diaz. Madden has residences in both Los Angeles and Sydney. Good Charlotte were particularly popular in Australia, and Madden has since labelled the country his "home away from home."

Madden has a trademark habit of chewing toothpicks to help reduce the number of cigarettes he smokes a day.

Discography

With Good Charlotte

Good Charlotte (2000)
The Young and the Hopeless (2002)
The Chronicles of Life and Death (2004)
Good Morning Revival (2007)
Greatest Remixes (2008)
Cardiology (2010)
Youth Authority (2016)
Generation Rx (2018)

With The Madden Brothers
 Before – Volume One (2011)
 Greetings from California (2014)

Guest appearances

Filmography

References

1979 births
American expatriates in Australia
American male singers
American punk rock singers
Good Charlotte members
Identical twins
Living people
Logie Award winners
People from Waldorf, Maryland
Singers from Maryland
Twin musicians
American twins
21st-century American singers